Génération Goldman is a compilation/tribute album series containing interpretations of the songs of popular French singer and songwriter Jean-Jacques Goldman. It is released on My Major Company (France) noting that Michaël Goldman, son of the artist is a co-founder of the label. Goldman has not released a studio album since 2001.

The original album Génération Goldman was released on 19 November 2012 on My Major Company France and M 6 Music label as a tribute to Goldman. A follow-up second volume was released on 26 August 2013 entitled Génération Goldman Volume 2.

Due to the popularity of the albums, in August 2014, the two volumes were re-released under one cover as Génération Goldman Vol. 1 and Vol. 2

Génération Goldman

Songs
The album contains 14 tracks performed by 20 artists with "Envole-moi" performed by M. Pokora and Tal becoming the first single from the greatly anticipated album. On November 19, 2012, the day of the album release, the new single, "Famille", was released.

Other artists to have tracks on the album include Amel Bent, Ivyrise, Corneille, Shy'm, Christophe Willem, Florent Mothe, Zaz and Amaury Vassili.

Charts

Weekly charts

Year-end charts

Charting single releases from the album

Certifications

Génération Goldman Volume 2

After the success of the original album, a second volume of the Génération Goldman was  released on 26 August 2013.

As a pre-release single from Volume 2, Amel Bent and Soprano interpreting "Quand la musique est bonne" charted in SNEP charts in May 2013.

Track listing

Charts

Weekly charts

Year-end charts

Charting single releases from the album

Génération Goldman Vol. 1 and Vol. 2

After the success of the two original albums, in August 2014, a limited edition of the two albums was re-released together under one cover charting in its own right in France on the French SNEP Albums Chart.

Charts

References

External links
Facebook

2012 compilation albums
Tribute albums
My Major Company albums